Kasper Winde Risgård (born 4 January 1983) is a retired Danish footballer who played as a midfielder.

Career

AaB
Risgård was introduced to top flight football late in the 2002–03 season when AaB surprisingly found themselves struggling in the bottom of the table. Risgård made some fine displays, including a goal in the DONG Cup semifinal against Brøndby IF and a vital winner against Køge BK.

During the next seasons, Risgård fell further away from the team and was eventually loaned out to local rivals FC Nordjylland. When he returned to AaB, he remained a substitute but due to many injuries, Risgård got a new chance as central defender in the end of the 2005–06 season, where he played well for half a year before being moved once again in the fall of 2007. This time Aalborg BK coach Erik Hamrén moved him to a position as a defensive midfielder, where he proved himself an important first team player. Due to a series of impressive performances as a defensive midfielder in both the Danish Superliga and the UEFA Cup Danish national coach Morten Olsen brought him into the Danish national league squad.

Bielefeld
On 9 June 2009, Risgård signed a three-year deal with German 2. Bundesliga club Arminia Bielefeld on a free transfer. Here he joined up with fellow dane, Jonas Kamper. On 4 December 2009, Risgård scored his first goal for the club in a 2–3 defeat against Fortuna Düsseldorf.

Panionios
On 31 August 2010, Risgård signed a two-year deal with Superleague Greece club Panionios G.S.S. He was released from his contract with Panionios in February 2011, as Paninios didn't pay his wages for four months.

Silkeborg IF
On 1 March 2011, Risgård signed a two-year deal with the Danish Superliga club Silkeborg IF. As the transfer took place outside the transfer window, the contract had to be approved by UEFA, before he could play for Silkeborg IF.

AaB
On 19 July 2013, Risgård signed a one-year deal with his childhood club AaB. On 29 January 2014 the contract was extended with two more years. Risgård retired at the end of the 2018/19 season.

Honours

Club
AaB
Danish Superliga (2): 2007–08, 2013–14
Danish Cup (1): 2013–14

References

External links
 Danish national team profile 

1983 births
Living people
Danish men's footballers
AaB Fodbold players
Silkeborg IF players
Danish Superliga players
Panionios F.C. players
Arminia Bielefeld players
2. Bundesliga players
Association football midfielders
Expatriate footballers in Greece
Sportspeople from Aalborg